"John Doe" is a song by American rapper B.o.B, featuring guest vocals from American singer-songwriter Priscilla. It was released on December 3, 2013, as the fourth single from B.o.B's third studio album, Underground Luxury (2013). It has since peaked at number 69 on the US Billboard Hot 100 chart.

Music video
The song's music video, directed by K. Asher Levin, was released on January 16, 2014. The video features American pornographic actress Skin Diamond, portraying a young lady who has recently moved to Hollywood in hopes of becoming a star. American pornographic actress Allie Haze also makes a cameo appearance.

Remix
On the song's official remix, which was released on May 27, 2014, American singer-songwriter Sevyn Streeter replaces Priscilla on the chorus. This reworked version also features new production.

Chart performance

Weekly charts

Year-end charts

Release history

References

2013 singles
2013 songs
B.o.B songs
Grand Hustle Records singles
Atlantic Records singles
Songs written by B.o.B
Songs written by Muni Long
Songs about drugs
Muni Long songs